Plainview is a census-designated place (CDP) in Tulare County, California. The 2010 United States census reported Plainview's population was 945.

Geography
According to the United States Census Bureau, the CDP covers an area of 0.3 square miles (0.8 km), all of it land.

Demographics
At the 2010 census Plainview had a population of 945. The racial makeup of Plainview was 358 (37.9%) White, 8 (0.8%) African American, 20 (2.1%) Native American, 2 (0.2%) Asian, 0 (0.0%) Pacific Islander, 517 (54.7%) from other races, and 40 (4.2%) from two or more races. Hispanic or Latino of any race were 865 people (91.5%).

The whole population lived in households, no one lived in non-institutionalized group quarters and no one was institutionalized.

There were 209 households, 148 (70.8%) had children under the age of 18 living in them, 111 (53.1%) were opposite-sex married couples living together, 47 (22.5%) had a female householder with no husband present, 31 (14.8%) had a male householder with no wife present.  There were 20 (9.6%) unmarried opposite-sex partnerships, and 3 (1.4%) same-sex married couples or partnerships. 12 households (5.7%) were one person and 2 (1.0%) had someone living alone who was 65 or older. The average household size was 4.52.  There were 189 families (90.4% of households); the average family size was 4.66.

The age distribution was 394 people (41.7%) under the age of 18, 108 people (11.4%) aged 18 to 24, 227 people (24.0%) aged 25 to 44, 157 people (16.6%) aged 45 to 64, and 59 people (6.2%) who were 65 or older.  The median age was 23.1 years. For every 100 females, there were 104.5 males.  For every 100 females age 18 and over, there were 107.9 males.

There were 224 housing units at an average density of 724.7 per square mile, of the occupied units 107 (51.2%) were owner-occupied and 102 (48.8%) were rented. The homeowner vacancy rate was 2.7%; the rental vacancy rate was 3.7%.  485 people (51.3% of the population) lived in owner-occupied housing units and 460 people (48.7%) lived in rental housing units.

References

Census-designated places in Tulare County, California
Census-designated places in California